Margaret Mitchell (born 1968) is a Scottish portrait and documentary photographer. Her work has recurrent themes of childhood and youth, place and belonging. She works on short and long term personal projects as well as editorially and on commissions. Her photography ranges from exploring communities, children and childhood as well as long-term documentation projects on issues of social inequality. Ideas around the paths that lives take have been explored in several series. A book of her work, Passage, was published in 2021.

In 2018 Mitchell was awarded in the Sony World Photography Awards (2nd place Professional Category, Contemporary Issues) with her long term series In This Place. In 2017 she was awarded Gold in the Royal Photographic Society International Photography Exhibition IPE 160 for a series of environmental portraits from In This Place. Her work is held in the collection of the National Galleries of Scotland. Mitchell has exhibited at the Scottish National Portrait Gallery as part of When We Were Young | Photographs of Childhood from the National Galleries of Scotland. She has also shown work in the Taylor Wessing Exhibition at the National Portrait Gallery.

Education 
Mitchell graduated from Edinburgh Napier University with a degree in Photography, Film and Television in 1994 and has a Masters in Photography from Edinburgh College of Art (2000).

Career
In 1994, Mitchell made the documentary work 'Family'. The series concentrated on the lives of Mitchell's sister and her children in the Raploch area in the town of Stirling, Scotland, an area which scores highly in the Scottish Index of Multiple Deprivation. Mitchell states that photography as social commentary is what drew her into being a photographer and how her work 'Family' was 'rooted in the stigmatisation of certain strands of society'

In her early career, she also worked in areas of disability and representation, working within participatory arts practice and as a photography lecturer for over 10 years. Her projects on childhood often contain a psychological aspect and she is quoted as saying she is "pulled by the personal, the experiential in people's lives and that often includes issues-based work". Early portrait series include 'Tiree Schoolchildren', 'Into The Village' and later 'The Eastern Wood'.

Mitchell continued to concentrate on her main themes. Her series 'In This Place' (2016–17) updates the lives of the people in 'Family' (1994) in a story of social inequality alongside the importance of family ties and the experience of loss. The work documents the family's relationships against the backdrop of urban displacement and inequality that passes from generation to generation. This large documentary asks the viewer to consider how society operates and to see that choices are not equal for all people across the economic spectrum. It offers a broader commentary on social and domestic environment, opportunity and social inequality within Scotland and the UK. This work has been widely exhibited within awards, festivals and galleries.

Other projects include The Guisers which looks at the psychological and cultural aspects of children at Halloween in Scotland. This documentation of a centuries old tradition in Scotland explores the often complex reasoning behind the children's choices in Halloween costumes.

Publications
Passage. Liverpool: Bluecoat, 2021. . With a foreword by Alasdair Foster. Includes the series Family and In This Place.

Awards 

 2017 LensCulture Portrait Awards: Finalist Series
 2017 Kuala Lumpur International Photoawards – Winner 2nd place
 2017 Renaissance Photography Prize – Finalist Series
 2017 Royal Photographic Society IPE 160 – Gold Award Winner
 2018 Sony World Photography Awards – 2nd place Professional Category, Contemporary Issues
 2018 Slideluck Editorial Leica Award with Leica Fotografie International

Exhibitions 
 2014–15  National Portrait Gallery, London Taylor Wessing 2014 Photographic Portrait Prize Exhibition
 2015 Gallery 103, Street Level Photoworks, Glasgow Documenting Britain
 2016 Krakow Photomonth Der Greif »A Process 2.0«
 2017 Street Level Photoworks, Glasgow Ambit: Photographies from Scotland
 2017 St Andrews Photography Festival
 2017 Whitebox Gallery, Kuala Lumpur Kuala Lumpur International Portrait Photoawards
 2017 Getty Images Gallery London Renaissance Photography Prize
 2017 The Royal Photographic Society IPE 160 Exhibition PHOTOBLOCK at The Old Truman Brewery
 2017 Street Level Photoworks off-site exhibition at the Lillie Art Gallery: In This Place
 2017–18 Scottish National Portrait Gallery: When We Were Young: Photographs of Childhood from the National Galleries of Scotland
 2018 The Printspace, London Awards exhibition IPE160
 2018 An Lanntair, Stornoway
 2018 Flow Fotofest,Inverness
 2018 Sony World Photography Awards Exhibition Somerset House, London
 2018 Slideluck Editorial global tour, DOCfield Barcelona and Fotofestival Solar Brazil
 2018–19 Portcullis House & Open Eye Gallery '209 Women'
 2019 FORMAT International Photography Festival 'In This Place'
 2019 Festival Circulation(s), Paris 'Family' and 'In This Place'
 2019 Open Eye Gallery, Kinship

References

External links 
 

Documentary photographers
Scottish women photographers
Alumni of Edinburgh Napier University
1968 births
Living people
Women photojournalists
21st-century women photographers